Endoconidium is a genus of fungi. The species Endoconidium temulentum grows on the grass Lolium temulentum or darnel grass and is possibly responsible for the grass's toxic effects.

Leotiomycetes